Madha railway station is a small railway station in Solapur district, Maharashtra. Its code is MA. It serves Madha city. The station consists of two platforms, neither not well sheltered. It lacks many facilities including water and sanitation.

Trains 
 Mumbai–Chennai Mail
 Miraj–Solapur Special (unreserved)
 Pune–Solapur Passenger (unreserved)
 Pune–Solapur Passenger
 Siddheshwar Express
 Maharashtra Express

References

Railway stations in Solapur district
Solapur railway division